UkrTransNafta is an open joint-stock company established by the government of Ukraine in June 2001. The company exists to manage oil transportation operations through the Ukrainian pipeline network. The company oversees the activities of two main oil pipeline systems: the Ukrainian section of the Druzhba pipeline, and the Pridniprovski oil pipeline. The company is also in charge of the Odessa-Brody pipeline.

Mission
UkrTransNafta seeks to:
 promote the integration of Ukrainian oil pipelines into the European oil pipeline systems;
 promote business opportunities pertaining to the Ukrainian oil pipeline systems
 promote investment in the Odessa–Brody pipeline

Pipeline system
UkrTransNafta's oil transportation system has a capacity of 110 million tons a year. The pipeline system includes 40 pumping stations. Tank farm capacity is about 1 million cubic meters.

See also
Druzhba pipeline
Russia–Ukraine gas disputes
Naftogas

References

External links
  Official site of UkrTransNafta

Oil companies of Ukraine
Companies established in 2001
Oil pipeline companies
Naftogaz